These are the Record World number-one albums of 1968.

Chart history

References

American music-related lists
1968 in American music